Selam Dengesiz (Salute Unbalanced) is the second studio album by Turkish singer Ayşe Hatun Önal. It was released on 17 February 2017 by Sony Music Entertainment and Epic Records. Following the release of her first studio album Sustuysam in 2008, Önal went on a hiatus until 2014 when she released the single "Çak Bir Selam" and changed her style from electronic music to pop. Her second studio album features a variety of pop and dance songs.

The name of the album is a mixture of the title of two songs: "Çak Bir Selam" and "Dengesiz". A music video for the lead single "Olay", was released together with the album.

Background 
Ayşe Hatun Önal released the electro house Sustuysam in April 2008, together with a music video for one of its songs, after which she rejected Sony Music's offer of making a second music video and did not release any songs until 2014 when she released the single "Çak Bir Selam". She later explained the reason in an interview in 2014: "The album had made me very tired. I did not want to do anything at that moment. I said that the songs would find their way anyway, and just disappeared."

Lyrics and composition 
Selam Dengesiz consists of ten songs and six remixed songs. The songs were written by İsra Gülümser, Gülşah Tütüncü, Gülhan, Onur Özdemir and Alper Narman. The other six alternative versions were prepared by İskender Paydaş, Erdem Kınay, Gürsel Çelik, Kaan Gökman, Osman Çetin and Sezer Uysal. The album's first song "Dengesiz" was written by İsra Gülümser. Its lead single "Olay" was written by Gülümsere as well, and for this song Önal worked with producer Mahmut Orhan for the first time. Ayşe Hatun Önal, talked about her collaboration with Gülümsere, saying: "There are  two songs written by İsra. For a year I made her write these lyrics. I sat with her for six months and told her my life story, wishing that it would be a source of inspiration". The album's fourth song "Dur Dünyam" was written and composed by Ayşe Hatun Önal. Önal later discussed the song's writing process: "I wrote it 5 years ago. When I listen to a non-verbal music, a timbre catches my attention and I start writing. In general, the story is told to the composers and they make the songs. Those whom we call fabricators have solved the mathematics of this work and do it according to mathematics. I don't want to learn that math specifically. Because then there will be no feelings in my works. ‘Kalbe Ben’ and ‘Dur Dünyam’ were the story of my life and the lyrics came out from my inside at once." The fifth song "Devran" was written by Gülhan and Gürsel Çelik. Önal later said that she "found the song not suitable for herself". The sixth song "Sirenler" was written by Onur Özdemir and released before the album as a promotional single. The seventh song "Cehennem" was also written by Onur Özdemir together with Alper Narman, and it was arranged by İskender Paydaş.

Track listing

Personnel 
Credits adapted from Selam Dengesiz album booklet.

 Ayşe Hatun Önal - vocals, songwriter , composer 
 İsra Gülümser - songwriter 
 Gülşah Tütüncü - songwriter , composer , backing vocals 
 Ayman Bahgat - composer 
 Amr Mostafa - composer 
 Ahmed Salah Hosny - composer 
 Gülhan - songwriter , composer 
 Alper Narman - songwriter , composer 
 Onur Özdemir - songwriter , composer , vocals , backing vocals 
 İskender Paydaş - arrangement , keyboard and key instruments , mixing , rhythm programming , synthesizer 
 Gürsel Çelik - arrangement , entry , interim entry , songwriter , composer 
 Mahmut Orhan - arrangement , recording , mixing 
 Osman Çetin - arrangement 
 Gündem Yaylı Grubu - string instruments 
 Mehmet Akatay - percussion 
 Ali Yılmaz - stringed authentic instruments 
 Eyüp Hamiş - wind instruments 
 Gültekin Kaçar - guitar , acoustic guitar , electric guitar 
 Aslıhan Batur - violin 
 Aytaç Kart - guitar 
 İstanbul Strings - violin 
 Caner Güneysu - guitar 
 Aycan Teztel - trombone 
 Şenova Ülker - trumpet 
 Tevfik Kulak Band - brass instruments 
 Cüneyt Karayalçın - bass guitar 
 Su Soley - backing vocals 
 Pınar Çubukçu - backing vocals 
 Gaye Biçer - backing vocals 
 Serkan Özyurt - recording , record editing , mixing , acoustic guitar 
 Özgür Yurtoğlu - mixing 
 İlker Bayraktar - recording , recording engineer 
 Özgün Saatçioğlu - recording 
 Emre Kıral - mastering 
 Altay Ekren - mixing

Release history

References

External links 

 

2017 albums
Epic Records albums
Sony Music albums